Mona Kareem (born 1987) is a Bedoon writer, translator and literary scholar. She is also an advocate of migrant rights. She was born in Kuwait to a stateless  family, and this is a theme in her literary work.

Education and career
Due to Kareem's stateless legal status, she could not attend a public university. Her academic history and poetic prowess earned her a scholarship from a charitable family in Kuwait. Kareem studied at the American University of Kuwait.

Kareem received a scholarship from Binghamton University in 2011. She moved to the US and obtained a doctoral degree in Comparative Literature. Her thesis, entitled “Good Mothers, Bad Sisters: Arab Women Writers in the Nation,” explored subalternity in the Arab literary scene.

Kareem worked as a lecturer at Binghamton University and at the University of Maryland. She has held fellowships from Poetry International, Arab American National Museum, BANFF Centre, National Centre for Writing, etc. Kareem translated the novel Kindred by Octavia Butler and some poems of Alejandra Pizarnik into Arabic. She translated Instructions Within by Ashraf Fayadh (2017) and it was nominated for Best Translated Book Award. She is presently a translator-in-residence at Princeton University.
 
Having faced discrimination as a Bidoon, Kareem established Bedoon Rights, an online reference dedicated to raising awareness on the prejudice and struggles the stateless face in Kuwait.

As a literary scholar, Kareem's research interests range from Arabic poetry and prose, contemporary feminist fiction, and literary translation strategies to subaltern subjectivities.

Mona Kareem was denied entry to Kuwait at Kuwait International Airport when she flew there to see her family in 2023. Kareem told the Associated Press that Kuwaiti authorities informed her that she risked imprisonment if she remained in the country. She had previously been questioned about Bidoon-related activism and pledged not to have political discussions.

Poetry
Kareem's poetry is characterized by the use of simple language and vivid imagery. It is frequently arranged in short lines. The theme often deals with feminism and identity, especially as a migrant.

Works
At 14 years old, Kareem published her first poetry collection, . Two years later, she released her second anthology . Kareem published Ma anamū min adjlihi el yaum in 2016. In 2019, she released trilingual poetry collection Femme Ghosts. Her books have been translated to nine languages.

References

1987 births
Kuwaiti women poets
Living people
Binghamton University alumni
University System of Maryland faculty
Princeton University faculty
Stateless people
Binghamton University faculty
Arab translators
English–Arabic translators